Oligoryzomys arenalis, also known as the sandy colilargo or sandy pygmy rice rat, is a species of rodent in the genus Oligoryzomys of family Cricetidae. It is found in the Andes of Peru at 400 to 2850 m altitude, but may include more than one species.

References

Literature cited

Zeballos, H., Vivar, E. & Weksler, M. 2008. . In IUCN. IUCN Red List of Threatened Species. Version 2009.2. <www.iucnredlist.org>. Downloaded on November 27, 2009.

Oligoryzomys
Mammals of Peru
Mammals described in 1913
Taxa named by Oldfield Thomas
Taxonomy articles created by Polbot